Poppy Morgan (born 17 February 1983) is an English pornographic actress, model and director.

Career
Morgan worked as a trainee chef at London's "Blakes" restaurant. While on a smoking break she was approached by a photographer asking if she was interested in modelling.

The Wedding (produced by "Poppy Morgan Productions") documents her actual marriage to Darren Morgan (including a "hen night" orgy and promiscuity during the honeymoon).

In 2009 Morgan moved into directing alongside Taryn Thomas. In December 2013 Morgan received extensive coverage in the British press for her role in Hull's successful bid to be the 2017 UK City of Culture.

Awards and nominations

 2006 Eroticline Award winner – Best Actress International Websites
 2006 UK Adult Film and Television Award winner – Best Female Actress Of The Year
 2008 AVN Award winner - Best Sex Scene in a Foreign-Shot Production, for a 10-person group scene (Furious Fuckers Final Race)
2010 AVN Award winner – Best All-Girl Three-Way Sex Scene (The 8th Day)

See also
 List of British pornographic actors

References

External links
 
 
 
 

1983 births
Living people
Actresses from Kingston upon Hull
English pornographic film actresses
English pornographic film directors
English women in business
Women pornographic film directors